Conguillío Lake is a lake located in the La Araucanía Region of Chile, within the Conguillío National Park. The lake was formed by the damming of the Trufultruful River caused by a lava flow from the Llaima volcano.

References

Lakes of Chile
Lakes of Araucanía Region